Jesse Hallikas (born April 14, 1997) is a Finnish ice hockey left winger currently playing for Ketterä of Mestis.

Hallikas previously played nine games for SaiPa of Liiga during the 2016–17 season, scoring one goal. He signed for Ketterä om April 29, 2019.

References

External links

1997 births
Living people
Finnish ice hockey left wingers
Imatran Ketterä players
People from Imatra
SaiPa players
Sportspeople from South Karelia